Kohala may refer to:
Kohala (mountain)  an extinct volcano of Hawaii
Kohala, Hawaii, two districts on the island of Hawaii
Kohala, Pakistan, a town in Pakistan
Kohala Bridge, a bridge between Azad Kashmir and Pakistan
Kohala Hydropower Project Pakistan
Kohala, Jalandhar a village in Punjab, India
Kohala, Mysore, a village in Karnataka, India
Kohala, Estonia, village in Sõmeru Parish, Lääne-Viru County, Estonia
Hans Kohala (born 1966), Swedish athlete

See also 
 Koala (disambiguation)